Petter Emanuelsson (born August 7, 1991) is a Swedish professional ice hockey forward. He is currently under contract with Oulun Kärpät of the Finnish Liiga.

Playing career
Emanuelsson played with Skellefteå AIK in the Swedish Hockey League, making his debut during the 2009–10 Elitserien season. Emanuelsson's first SHL goal came on January 18, 2012, against Martin Gerber of the Växjö Lakers.

On June 11, 2013, Emanuelsson signed a two-year contract with the San Jose Sharks. In his first North American season in 2014–15, Emanuelsson scored 4 goals in 6 games with the Sharks AHL affiliate, the Worcester Sharks before suffering a season-ending injury.

On June 27, 2015, Emanuelsson was re-signed to a further one-year contract with the Sharks and spent the 2015-16 season with their newly founded AHL affiliate San Jose Barracuda, making 58 appearances with eleven goals and twelve assists.

He returned to his native Sweden for the 2016–17 season, signing with Luleå HF of the Swedish Hockey League (SHL) on May 18, 2016.

Career statistics

References

External links

1991 births
Living people
Luleå HF players
Oulun Kärpät players
Piteå HC players
San Jose Barracuda players
Skellefteå AIK players
Swedish ice hockey forwards
Worcester Sharks players